Eyn ol Din (also Romanized as ‘Eyn ol Dīn, ‘Eyn ed Dīn, and ‘Eyn od Dīn) is a village in Ujan-e Sharqi Rural District, Tekmeh Dash District, Bostanabad County, East Azerbaijan Province, Iran. At the 2006 census, its population was 2,397, in 510 families.

It is located 66 kilometers south east of Tabriz, the capital of the province. It is approximately 12,00 hectares.

Some believe that the center of the ancient city Ujan has been near the village. The indigenous villagers say that the ancient Ujan which has seen two severe earthquakes is buried in this region. About 50 years ago, an earthquake occurred near the mountain village called "Uçuk Dağ". Then the broken pieces of pottery, quasi-tandoor ditches and some other evidences appeared that was the reason for the existence of the ancient city there. Some Sights of the village are Al deresi şırşırası (AL Valley Falls), Mount Peri cihan ölen, the Village River, the Old Cemetery near Mount Uçuk dağ and many others.

Nature 
The main crops of this village are potatoes, carrots, cucumber. Recently, The villagers  grow fruits such as apples. Fish is also another source of income for the village. Qasimdaghi is the highest mountain in the village. The Mount Guneyquzey is located in the second class. The items listed below can be cited as another sights:
The Mount Mehralı, The Mount Kuş otaran, The Mount Ak dağ, Küller (Ujan's the Old Cemetery), The Valley Cehennem, The Fountain Daşlı Bulağ, The Fountain Baş Bulağ, The Fountain Mecci Bulağ. The Falls ‘Üçtireler’, ‘Eyvaz gözesi’, ‘Kara alem’. Its  weather  is mountainous cold  and wet.

References 

Populated places in Bostanabad County